Sarutobi may refer to:
 Sarutobi Sasuke, a character in Japanese children's stories
 Hiruzen Sarutobi (Naruto) or Third Hokage, a character in Naruto media
 Asuma Sarutobi (Naruto), a character in Naruto media
 Konohamaru Sarutobi (Naruto), a character in Naruto media
 Ayame Sarutobi (Gin Tama), a character in Gin Tama media

See also
 Sarutobi Ecchan, a Japanese media franchise
 Saru (disambiguation)